Total of best lifts in military press, snatch, and jerk. Ties are broken by the lightest body weight.

Final 

Key: OR = Olympic record; DNF = did not finish; NVL = no valid lift

After setting an Olympic record with 187.5 kg in the press, Rigert failed in all three attempts at 160 kg in the snatch, despite holding the world record at 167.5 kg. Rigert was so upset that he literally pulled his hair out and banged his head against a well. He was restrained by his colleagues, but the next day threw another fit and had to be sent home.

References

External links
 Official report

Weightlifting at the 1972 Summer Olympics